HMS Drake was the lead ship of her class of armoured cruisers built for the Royal Navy around 1900. She was assigned to several different cruiser squadrons in home waters upon completion, sometimes as flagship, until 1911 when she became the flagship of the Australia Station. Upon her return home, she was assigned to the 6th Cruiser Squadron of the 2nd Fleet and became the squadron's flagship when the fleet was incorporated into the Grand Fleet upon the outbreak of the First World War.

She remained with the Grand Fleet until refitted in late 1915, when she was transferred to the North America and West Indies Station for convoy escort duties. In 1916 she participated in the unsuccessful search for the German commerce raider . In late 1917 Drake was torpedoed by a German submarine off Northern Ireland and sank in shallow water with the loss of eighteen lives near Rathlin Island. The wreck was partly salvaged, beginning in 1920; a fishing trawler collided with the remainder of the wreck in 1962 and sank the next day. The wrecks of the two ships were demolished during the 1970s, but their remnants remain a popular dive site. Since June 2017, Drakes wreck has been a scheduled historic monument.

Design and description
The Drake-class ships were designed as faster and larger versions of the preceding  with a slightly more powerful armament. They displaced , over  more than the earlier ships.

The main armament of the Drake class consisted of two breech-loading (BL) 9.2-inch (234 mm) Mk X guns in single turrets, one each fore and aft of the superstructure. Her secondary armament of sixteen BL 6-inch (152 mm) Mk VII guns was arranged in casemates amidships. Eight of these were mounted on the lower deck and were only usable in calm weather. A dozen quick-firing (QF) 12-pounder (76 mm) 12-cwt guns were fitted for defence against torpedo boats. Two additional 12-pounder 8-cwt guns could be dismounted for service ashore. The ships also carried three 3-pounder (47 mm) Hotchkiss guns and two submerged 18-inch (450 mm) torpedo tubes.

By February 1916, all of the lower casemates for her six-inch guns had been plated over and six of them had been remounted on the upper deck so they could be used in heavy weather. Several twelve-pounders had to be removed to make room for the six-inch guns.

The ship's waterline armour belt had a maximum thickness of 6 inches and was closed off by  transverse bulkheads. The armour of the gun turrets and their barbettes was 6 inches thick while that of the casemates was 5 inches thick.

Construction and service
HMS Drake, named after the Elizabethan adventurer Sir Francis Drake, was laid down at Pembroke Dock on 24 April 1899, and launched on 5 March 1901, when she was christened by Mrs. Lort Phillips, wife of local landowner F. Lort Phillips, of Lawrenny. Based at Portsmouth for her gun, torpedo and circle trials in late 1902, there was also trials with a new type of propeller. She was completed on 13 January 1903 and assigned to the Cruiser Squadron of the Channel Fleet, under the command of the future First Sea Lord, Captain Francis Bridgeman.

John Jellicoe, also a future First Sea Lord and commander of the Grand Fleet, was her next captain in 1903–04. In 1907 the ship was commanded by Captain Arthur Hayes-Sadler and serving as the flagship of the 2nd Cruiser Squadron under the command of Rear Admiral Charles Henry Adair. The following year, Drake became the flagship of 1st Cruiser Squadron of the Channel Fleet (attending the Hudson–Fulton Celebration during this time) and then was assigned as flagship of the 5th Cruiser Squadron of the Atlantic Fleet in 1909. She was re-commissioned as the flagship of the Australia Station from early 1911 until returning to home waters in 1913. She then went into the 6th Cruiser Squadron, notionally part of the Second Fleet, on 13 March 1913, but actually was in care and maintenance under the control of the Third Fleet.

That fleet was merged into the Grand Fleet upon mobilization in mid-1914 and Drake became flagship of Rear Admiral William Grant, commander of the squadron. The squadron was briefly deployed at the beginning of the war to blockade the northern exit from the North Sea. In October 1914, under the command of Aubrey Smith, the ship was used to carry Russian bullion worth eight million pounds  to Britain; on arrival, Drake lay thirty miles off Archangel, and the gold was brought to her at night. The ship was refitted in October 1915 and then transferred to the North America and West Indies Station for convoy escort duties. She participated in the unsuccessful search in the West Indies for the German commerce raider  in December 1916.

Drake was torpedoed by the German submarine , commanded by Kapitänleutnant Otto Rohrbeck, on 2 October 1917 after her Convoy HH24 had dispersed for its several destinations. The torpedo struck the No. 2 Boiler Room and caused two of her engine rooms and the boiler room to flood, killing 18 crewmen. These gave her a list and knocked out her steam-powered steering. Her captain decided to steam for Church Bay on Rathlin Island and accidentally collided with the merchant ship  before she dropped anchor. The collision did not damage Drake much, but Mendip Range was forced to beach herself lest she sink. Drakes crew was taken off before she capsized later that afternoon.

Salvage of the wreck began in 1920 and continued for several years. On the night of 3 November 1962, the steam trawler Ella Hewett struck the wreck and subsequently sank almost atop Drake. Ammunition and ordnance was salvaged during the 1970s and the wrecks were demolished with depth charges to reduce the chance of any other ships coming to grief on the wrecks. In 1978, the remaining fuel oil was salvaged to reduce pollution from leaking oil.

Notes

Footnotes

Bibliography

Further reading
 Wilson, Ian (2011) HMS Drake: Rathlin Island Shipwreck. Rathlin Island: Rathlin Island Books.

External links

The ship in the Dreadnought Project
Photos of Drake, plus a transcript of a cruise book for 1905–07
Dept for Communities announcement of Rathlin Island listings

 

Drake-class cruisers
Ships built in Pembroke Dock
1901 ships
World War I cruisers of the United Kingdom
Ships sunk by German submarines in World War I
Shipwrecks of Northern Ireland
World War I shipwrecks in the Atlantic Ocean
Maritime incidents in 1917